Trosia pulla is a moth of the family Megalopygidae. It was described by William Trowbridge Merrifield Forbes in 1942.

References

Moths described in 1942
Megalopygidae